Agyneta pseudosaxatilis is a species of sheet weaver found in Russia and Kazakhstan. It was described by Tanasevitch in 1984.

References

pseudosaxatilis
Spiders described in 1984
Spiders of Russia
Spiders of Asia